Priesner is a German surname. Notable people with the surname include:

 (born 1947), German historian of science
Ernst Priesner (1934–1994), Austrian zoologist
Hermann Priesner (1891–1974), Austrian entomologist

German-language surnames